Alan Lee Cropsey (born June 13, 1952) is an American lawyer and politician who served as a member of both houses of the Michigan Legislature between 1979 and 2010. He is a member of the Republican Party.

Early life and education
Cropsey was born in Paw Paw, Michigan, the son of Harmon G. Cropsey, who was a member of the state house of representatives from the 42nd district, 1981–1982; and of the state senate from the 21st district, 1983–1990.

Cropsey holds a B.S. in mathematics education from Bob Jones University and a J.D. from Thomas Cooley Law School.

Political career 
Cropsey served in the Michigan House of Representatives from 1979 to 1982 and from 1993 to 1998. He was vice chairman of the State Board of Canvassers from 1999 to 2001, and chairman in 2001. Cropsey was a member of the Michigan Senate from 1983 to 1986 and also from 2003 to 2010, serving as majority floor leader during his second term (2007 to 2010). In March 2007 Cropsey became co-chairman of the "Americans of Faith" coalition that supported the presidential candidacy of John McCain.

Cropsey has strongly opposed gay marriage and sexually explicit video games. He received a Defender of Freedom Award from the National Rifle Association in 1996 and a Legislator of the Year Award from the Michigan Conservative Union in 1983.

Personal life 
Cropsey married Erika Rumminger in 1979, and the couple has four children.

References

1952 births
Bob Jones University alumni
Western Michigan University Cooley Law School alumni
Living people
People from Paw Paw, Michigan
Republican Party Michigan state senators
Republican Party members of the Michigan House of Representatives
People from DeWitt, Michigan
20th-century American politicians
21st-century American politicians